Sinar Dimaja Maisara Navy Kepala Batas Football Club also known as SDM Navy Kepala Batas FC is a Malaysian football club formerly playing in Malaysia FAM League. The club is based in Kepala Batas, Penang, Malaysia. In 2013, the club has pulled from the league for financial reasons.

Achievements

Transfers
For recent transfers, see List of Malaysian football transfers 2012

External links
 Soccerway profile

Defunct football clubs in Malaysia
Football clubs in Malaysia
2007 establishments in Malaysia